The  was a dual-purpose gun used by the Imperial Japanese Navy during World War II.

Use 
It was used on the  light cruisers and the aircraft carrier . A total of 28 guns were produced between 1940 and 1944.

Four additional weapons were used as coastal artillery at Maizuru, Kyoto.

Bibliography

External links
 The Type 98 on navweaps.com

World War II naval weapons
World War II anti-aircraft guns
Naval guns of Japan
76 mm artillery
Weapons and ammunition introduced in 1940